Following heavy rain in September 2021, the Saurashtra region of Gujarat state of India was affected by severe flooding. It resulted in death of at least six people.

Flood
Starting 12 September 2021, Jamnagar, Rajkot, Junagadh as well as districts of Saurashtra were severely affected by heavy rain in short period of time resulting in flood. Several roads were damaged and connectivity was lost for several villages. A national highway and 18 state highways were closed in these districts.

Relief and rescue
The personnel from National Disaster Relief Force (NDRF), State Disaster Relief Force (SDRF), Indian Air Force and Indian Navy were deployed to carry out relief and rescue operations. Fifteen teams of NDRF were sent to Jamnagar district. Indian Navy sent six teams for assistance as well as teams from INS Valsura. More than 7000 people were evacuated and 200 more were rescued. At least six people died in flood related incidents in September 2021.

See also
 2017 Gujarat flood

References

Gujarat
Gujarat
Gujarat flood
Jamnagar district
September 2021 events in India
Rajkot district
History of Gujarat (1947–present)